Baldwin Boys' High School (abbreviated BBHS, informally referred to as Baldwins) is a private boys school for boarders and day scholar, founded in 1880 in Bangalore, India. The school is run by Methodist Church in India under the chairmanship of a bishop.

History
Among prominent personalities in the school's history are Bishop and Mrs. Williams F. Oldham, Rev. John Edward Robinson, Rev. Ira A. Richards, Rev. T.R. Toussaint, Rev. J.B. Buttrick, Mr. C.N. Weston and Mr. Pfeiffer.

Bishop and Mrs. William F. Oldham, surveyors, started a school at their residence on Alexandria Street. Their aim was to provide schooling for English-speaking Methodist children. When the Oldhams left India for theological studies in the United States, the school was transferred to the vestry of the Richmond Town Methodist Church and placed under then Pastor, Rev. John Edward Robinson, elected Missionary Bishop in 1904. Prior to this, John Baldwin, a wealthy American businessman and theologist, founded the Oldhams' school on a large scale and gave it its name.

The first Principal, Rev. Marion B. Kirk from East Ohio Conference served in all capacities at the school as house-holder, administrator, teacher, gamester and musician. After six months, Rev. Kirk was transferred to Kolar's Orphanage and Mission.

School life

The school's motto is "Reverentia Jehovae est Caput Sapientiae" – "The fear of the Lord is the beginning of wisdom" (Proverbs 9:10). The watchwords of the institution are "Integritas et Veritas", meaning Righteousness and Truth.

Notable Educators and Principals at Baldwins
Rev. M.B. Kirk 1880
Rev. I.A. Richards 1881 – 1885
Rev. B.T. Eddy 1885 – 1886
Rev. W. Bowser 1886
Rev. Homer Stuntz 1887 – 1888
Rev. W.L. King 1888 – 1889
Rev. W.H. Hollister 1890 – 1891
Rev. T.R. Toussaint 1892 – 1898
Rev. C.W. Ross DeSouza 1899 – 1902
Rev. P.V. Roberts 1902 – 1910
Rev. J.B. Buttrick (Principal) 1910 – 1913
Rev. A.B. Coates (Headmaster)
Rev. A.B. Coates (Principal) 1914
Rev. J.W. Simmons 1914 – 1917
Rev. E.J. Guest 1917 – 1920
Rev. H.F. Hilmer (Principal) 1920
Rev. E.A. Seamands (Headmaster)
Rev. A.E. Cook 1921
Rev. Z.A. Olson 1922 – 1927 (April)
Mr. C.N. Weston 1927 – 1932
Mr. R.A.B. Andersen 1932 (Acting)
Mr. C.N. Weston 1933 – 1936
Mr. R.A.B. Andersen 1936 (Acting)
Mr. C.N. Weston 1937 – 1941
Mr. R.A.B. Andersen 1942 – 1945 (Acting) (Mr. C. N. Weston was in the British Indian Army from 1942–1945)
Mr. C.N. Weston 1946 – 1947
Mr. R.A.B. Andersen
Rev. Fred Gokavi
Mr. S.D. Samuel- Principal
Mr. J.S. Williams- Principal
Mr. P.K. Das- Principal
Mr. Mohan Murthy | Principal (2002 - 2003)
Dr. Karunakaran | Principal (2004 - 2006)
Mr. Dinakar Wilson | Principal (2007 - 2017)
Mr. Augustine Charles | Principal (2017)
Mrs. Lydia Samuel | Principal (2017 - 2018)
Dr. Antony D'Souza | Principal (2018 - 2019)

Mrs. Leena Daniel | Principal (2019 - Present)

See also
 Baldwin Girls High School
Bishop Cotton Boys' School
Bishop Cotton Girls' School
St Joseph's Boys' High School
Cathedral High School
The Frank Anthony Public School
Bethany High School

References

External links
 Official website

Boys' schools in India
Methodist schools in India
Christian schools in Karnataka
Boarding schools in Karnataka
High schools and secondary schools in Bangalore
Educational institutions established in 1880
1880 establishments in British India